Zinc finger protein Aiolos also known as Ikaros family zinc finger protein 3 is a protein that in humans is encoded by the IKZF3 gene.

Function 

This gene encodes a member of the Ikaros family of zinc-finger proteins. Three members of this protein family (Ikaros, Aiolos and Helios) are hematopoietic-specific transcription factors involved in the regulation of lymphocyte development. This gene product is a transcription factor that is important in the regulation of B lymphocyte proliferation and differentiation. Both Ikaros and Aiolos can participate in chromatin remodeling. Regulation of gene expression in B lymphocytes by Aiolos is complex as it appears to require the sequential formation of Ikaros homodimers, Ikaros/Aiolos heterodimers, and Aiolos homodimers. At least six alternative transcripts encoding different isoforms have been described.

Interactions 

IKZF3 has been shown to interact with BCL2-like 1 and HRAS.

References

Further reading

External links 
 

Transcription factors